Przezmark  is a village in the administrative district of Gmina Elbląg, within Elbląg County, Warmian-Masurian Voivodeship, in northern Poland.

The village has a population of 119.

Notable residents
 Johannes von Eben (1855–1924), Prussian General

References

Castles of the Teutonic Knights
Przezmark